Hajji Ismail Dogomuqo Berzeg (1763–1846) was a Circassian military commander and politician who served as the 2nd leader of the Circassian Confederation from 1827 to 1839. He was also the princely leader of the Ubykh tribe. He took part in both military and political capacity in the Russo-Circassian War. After 1838, he acted as a diplomat between Circassia and England.

Early life 

Berzeg was born in 1763 in Ubykhia. English agent and traveler James Bell noted that each Berzeg family member could send 150 men to the battlefield, a combined 3,000 warriors. Saad-Girey Berzeg, Ismail's predecessor, was the Ubykh leader at the beginning of the 19th century. In 1823, after Saad-Girey's death, Ismail was elected leader of the Berzeg clan and the commander of all Ubykhs. Ismail lived in the valley of the Sochi River, on its right bank, two hours from the sea.

Bell described Ismail Dogomuko Berzeg: "He was a tall man with beautiful gray eyes. His influence was determined not only by belonging to the strongest surname among the Ubykhs, but also by his ebullient energy, courage and intelligence." Bell described him as a religious Muslim.

Beginning in 1827, Ismail engaged in organizing a military confederation of the tribes living on the Black Sea coast. By the end of 1839, he had united the population between Tuapse and Gagra into a union. During this period Bell characterized him as, "Circassian Washington". At an old age, in 1835, during the assault on Gagra, Berzeg was seriously wounded. In 1836 he commanded the Ubykh detachment during another raid. In the war, Hajji Ismail lost all nine of his sons.

In 1840, Berzeg organized an attack on Russian coastal outposts. In February-March, the Ubykhs stormed the fortresses of Lazarevskoe, Velyaminovskoe and Mikhailovskoe on the Vulan River. Attempts were made to occupy Adler, Golovinskoe and Navaginskoe forts. 

Russian troops made great efforts to recapture these strongholds. Later that year, Berzeg organized a punitive campaign against the Abaza clans on the coast, who did not take part in the anti-Russian struggle.

In 1841, he participated in negotiations with Russian military leaders in Sochi, but the negotiations failed. Russian leaders stated that the Circassians were "poor villagers waiting for help from the English". A Russian officer, Lorer, who witnessed Ismail Berzeg's meeting with the Russians, later wrote in his memoirs: 

In 1846, Berzeg, together with his nephew Qerandiqo Berzeg, fought many battles with the Russian armies before leaving for Hajj. He died that year returning home.

References 

People of the Caucasian War
1846 deaths
1763 births
Circassian military personnel of the Russo-Circassian War